Hiệp Hòa can refer to:
 Emperor Hiệp Hòa, the sixth emperor of the Vietnamese Nguyễn Dynasty.
 Hiệp Hòa District in Bac Giang Province.
 Hiệp Hòa, a township in Duc Hoa District, Long An province.
 Hiệp Hòa, Long An, a commune in Duc Hoa District, Long An province.
 Hiệp Hòa, Biên Hòa, a ward in Bien Hoa, Dong Nai province.
 Hiệp Hòa, Hai Phong, a commune in Vinh Bao District, Hai Phong.
 Hiệp Hòa, Thai Binh, a commune in Vu Thu District, Thai Binh province.
 Hiệp Hòa, Quang Nam, a commune in Hiep Duc District, Quang Nam province.
 Hiệp Hòa, Tra Vinh, a commune in Cau Ngang District, Tra Vinh province.
 Hiệp Hòa, Quang Ninh, a commune in Quang Yen, Quang Ninh province.
 Hiệp Hòa, Hai Duong, a commune in Kinh Mon District, Hai Duong province.